Detroit Cougars can refer to:

 Detroit Cougars (NHL), original name of the Detroit Red Wings (1926–1930)
 Detroit Cougars (soccer), a US soccer team from 1967 to 1968